Deaths of United States federal judges in active service have profound political and procedural effects. Due to their implications for the political composition of the courts on which they serve, they can result in unexpected political conflicts regarding appointments to fill those seats. Such incidences can also disrupt the operations of the court with respect to active cases assigned to the deceased judge, and with opinions written by the deceased judge but not yet distributed. Historically, the rate of judges dying in active service was highest in the early days of the country, but declined sharply as lifespans increased, and as various legislation was introduced first allowing retiring judges to collect a pension, and later allowing judges to transition from active service to senior status, continuing to do judicial work in a semi-retired state.

Background
While Article Three of the United States Constitution provides that "Judges, both of the supreme and inferior Courts, shall hold their Offices during good Behaviour", thereby securing lifetime appointments, in practice a substantial majority of federal judges have resigned, retired, or otherwise left active service prior to their death. In Federalist No. 79, Alexander Hamilton, advocating for lifetime judicial appointments rather than a set retirement age, suggested that the people should "consider how few there are who outlive the season of intellectual vigor, and how improbable it is that any considerable portion of the bench, whether more or less numerous, should be in such a situation at the same time". A majority of federal judges who died in office in the 18th and 19th centuries died before reaching the age of 65, with several dying in their 30s. As one source has noted, "given what we now know about health and ageing, it must have been uncommon then for old age to impact adversely on the performance of a federal judge's official duties. However, as the epidemiological transition took root, and as life expectancy in the United States lengthened, early death provided a dwindling solution to age-related declined in mental capacity. Instead, the judicial system had to place greater reliance on the discretion of federal judges to retire at an appropriate point in their careers". Concerns about the capacity of aging judges were often dealt with informally; for example, Supreme Court Justice George Shiras Jr. recounted having once been part of a committee "sent to suggest to an aged judge that he had remained in service too long".

The Judiciary Act of 1869 allowed judges to receive a pension upon retirement, and beginning in 1919, the retirement of judges from active duty was further facilited by legislation creating senior status, in which a judge could retire from full-time service while continuing to receive full pay for engaging in a lighter amount of work. Historically, judges have often sought to time their retirement from the bench so that their replacement can be named by a president of the same political party; the death of a judge in office therefore presents a situation where this timing is out of the judge's control.

Political consequences
Due to the unpredictability of such circumstances, deaths of judges in active service are more likely to lead to judicial appointment controversies (where one party resists the confirmation of a judge appointed by a president of the other party); such deaths occasionally change the structure of the court itself, as legislators may seek to avoid changing the balance of a particular court by abolishing the seat vacated by the death. These issues have most widely been reported in the popular media with respect to justices of the Supreme Court of the United States, but have also been reported with respect to judges of lower courts.

At the district court level, for example, Republicans were able to scuttle of the nomination by Democrat Jimmy Carter of recess appointment Walter Heen to replace Republican Gerald Ford-appointee Dick Yin Wong on the United States District Court for the District of Hawaii. Wong had died in 1978, and Republicans argued that there had always been Republican representation in the District. The seat was ultimately filled by Republican Ronald Reagan, who appointed Harold Fong.

Logistical consequences
Judges preparing to retire generally wind down the active cases over which they are presiding, or make preparations for the reassignment of these cases to other judges. Unlike planned retirements, deaths of judges can disrupt these active cases, necessitating redistribution of the court's docket to accommodate the handling of previously scheduled proceedings. The Federal Rules of Criminal Procedure, in particular, provide for the reassignment of cases where the presiding judge has died during a criminal trial.

In 2019, the Supreme Court ruled that where a judge serving on a panel died after voting on the outcome of a case, but before the decision was announced, the vote of the deceased judge could no longer be counted. The Court noted that "[f]ederal judges are appointed for life, not for eternity". Traditionally, law clerks of the deceased judge may be reassigned to other judges on the same court, or may be held over in chambers to work for the successor appointed to replace the deceased judge, although there is no legal requirement or guarantee that they be retained. Legislation provides for a survivor's annuity to benefit the widow, widower or minor child of a judge who dies while in service, which may be purchased via a deduction of 2.2% to 3.5% from the retirement benefit.

Lists
The following are lists of United States Article Three federal judges who died while in active service from 1789 to the present day. In some cases, judges have been appointed to one court, and then reassigned by operation of law to another court when the original court is subdivided, merged, or otherwise reconfigured. In other cases, judges initially appointed to one court have later been elevated to a higher court. This list indicates only the placement of the judge at the time of their death. For judges nominated by different presidents to different judicial offices, the list indicates only the last president to successfully nominate them to a judicial office.

1789–1869
98 United States federal judges died in office between the establishment of the federal judiciary with the Judiciary Act of 1789 and the enactment of the Judiciary Act of 1869, which provided for pensions for retiring federal judges, making it easier for them to depart the bench before death.

1870–1919
127 United States federal judges died in office between the enactment of the Judiciary Act of 1869, providing for pensions for retiring federal judges, and the enactment of legislation in 1919 allowing judges to serve in senior status. During this period the number of federal judgeships was substantially increased with the admission of new states to the union, and with the establishment of the United States courts of appeals by the Judiciary Act of 1891. In the same period, the two-party divide between the Democratic Party and the Republican Party became firmly established, with the appointment of judges developing as a point of contention between the two parties.

1920–1954
170 United States federal judges died in active service between the enactment of legislation in 1919 allowing judges over the age of 70 with more than 10 years of judicial service to serve in senior status, and the expansion of that legislation in 1954 to cover judges over the age of 65 with more than 15 years of judicial service.

1954–present
, 228 United States federal judges died in active service since the 1954 expansion of senior status to cover judges over the age of 65 with more than 15 years of judicial service. Although this is the largest number of judges to die over such a period of time, it is the lowest percentage, due to substantial expansions of the judiciary branch. Notably, only three United States Supreme Court justices have died in office in that period, whereas nearly forty had died in office over the preceding periods.

See also
List of United States federal judges killed in office
List of United States federal judges by longevity of service
List of United States Congress members who died in office
List of presidents of the United States who died in office

Notes

References

External links
U.S. Justices and Judges Who Died While Still Holding Office, from The Political Graveyard

Deaths in active service
Federal judges
Deaths in active service